The 1928 French Grand Prix (formally the XXII Grand Prix de l'A.C.F.) was a Grand Prix motor race held at Saint-Gaudens on 1 July 1928. The race was held over 10 laps of a 26.3 km course for a total distance of 263 km. This is the same circuit used for the Grand Prix du Comminges. The race was won by William Grover-Williams driving a Bugatti. Due to a lack of entries in 1926 and 1927 it was decided that the race should be held for sports cars.

Four 10 lap heats were held to determine the starters of the final. The final was run as a handicap race of 10 laps, with handicaps determined by the heats. The eventual winner William Grover-Williams was the last to start, 32 minutes and 8 seconds after the first group of cars was released.

Classification

Fastest lap: William Grover-Williams, 10min48 (138.6 km/h)

References 

French Grand Prix
1928 in French motorsport
1928 in motorsport
1928 in Grand Prix racing